Greenbush or Green Bush may refer to:

Places
In Canada:
 Greenbush, Ontario

In the United States:

 Greenbush, Georgia
 Greenbush, Illinois
 Greenbush, Kansas
 Greenbush, Maine
 Greenbush, Massachusetts
 Greenbush Line, a branch of the MBTA Commuter Rail system in Massachusetts
 Greenbush (MBTA station)
 Greenbush, Michigan
 Greenbush, Minnesota
 Greenbush, Brown County, Ohio
 Greenbush, Preble County, Ohio
 Greenbush, Virginia
 Greenbush, Wisconsin, a town
 Greenbush (community), Wisconsin, an unincorporated community
 Greenbush Branch, a stream in Georgia
 East Greenbush, New York
 North Greenbush, New York
 Rensselaer, New York, formerly known as Greenbush

People
 Billy Green Bush (born 1935), sometimes credited as Billy Greenbush, an American actor
 Lindsay and Sidney Greenbush (born 1970), twins who played Carrie Ingalls on the Little House on the Prairie television series
 Clay Greenbush (born 1968), American actor

Other uses
Green Bush (2005 film), an Australian film directed by Warwick Thornton

See also
 Greenbush Township (disambiguation)
 Green Bush Squirrel (Paraxerus poensis)
 "Green Bushes", an English folk song